Franco Ambriz is a playwright and director. His plays have been produced in New York City and Los Angeles. He co-wrote Footsteps In The Dark with the late Iranian director Reza Abdoh for the Los Angeles Festival,  artistic director Peter Sellars. The movie Upside Down, directed by the Mexican filmmaker Mário Mandujano, was based on his stage play Four Cows In New York City.

External links 
 
  Frank Ambriz at the New York Public Library for the Performing Arts

American dramatists and playwrights
American theatre directors
Year of birth missing (living people)
Living people